Ernest John McIntyre (19 April 1921 – 10 April 2003) was an Australian rules footballer who played for St Kilda and Collingwood in the Victorian Football League (VFL) during the 1940s. He was born at Albert Park, Victoria, a suburb of Melbourne, in 1921.

McIntyre, a ruckman, began his football career at Sandringham in 1939 before crossing to the VFL where he joined St Kilda. A dentist by profession, he played his football as an amateur and didn't appear at all for St Kilda in 1942 due to Navy commitments. He represented Victoria in an interstate match against South Australia at Adelaide in 1945.

Noted for his sportsmanlike conduct on the field, on one occasion during a game he helped an opponent Don Cordner to his feet and also once applauded another opponent Bill Morris after he took a good mark. This rubbed coach Fred Froude and the St Kilda committee up the wrong way and when McIntyre was relegated to 19th man for a game in 1948 he resigned and switched to Collingwood. He appeared in his first ever final series that year, kicking two goals in Collingwood's losing Preliminary Final against Melbourne.

A club cricketer for St Kilda during the 1940s, McIntyre also played two first-class cricket matches for Victoria as a right-arm fast-medium pace bowler, taking 11 wickets at a bowling average of 16.45 runs per wicket. Both his first-class matches were against Tasmania in December 1946 in non-Sheffield Shield matches. In the second fixture, at Hobart, McIntyre took 4/52 in the first innings which were his career best figures.

McIntyre died at Melbourne in April 2003. He was aged 81.

References

External links

Ernest McIntyre's playing statistics from The VFA Project

1921 births
2003 deaths
St Kilda Football Club players
Collingwood Football Club players
Sandringham Football Club players
Australian cricketers
Victoria cricketers
Australian dentists
Cricketers from Melbourne
Australian rules footballers from Melbourne
20th-century dentists
Royal Australian Navy personnel of World War II
People from Albert Park, Victoria
Military personnel from Melbourne